Fuerza natural (Spanish for Force of Nature, or more literally, Natural Force) is the fifth and final album by Gustavo Cerati, released on 1 September 2009. The album features a folk sound with acoustic guitars and presence of mandolins. The first cut of the album was Déjà vu. This album was certificated gold in Argentina for 40,000 copies sold on its first week of release and 500.000 worldwide. The album won a Latin Grammy in 2010 for Best Rock Album.

In 2010, a year following the release of the album, Cerati suffered a stroke post-concert in Caracas, Venezuela and went into a coma; his death on 4 September 2014 leaves Fuerza natural as his last release.

Track listing

Performing

 Gustavo Cerati: lead vocals except "Convoy", backing vocals, lead guitar, bass, synthesizer, Moog synthesizer, programming, audio filtering
 Gonzalo Córdoba: Second guitar
 Leandro Fresco: piano
 Fernando Nalé: bass
 Fernando Samalea: drums
 Anita Alvarez de Toledo: backing vocals, lead vocals on "Convoy", featured vocals on "He Visto a Lucy"

Guest musicians
 Richard Coleman: guitar

Certifications and sales

References

External links
Official website

2009 albums
Gustavo Cerati albums
Sony Music Argentina albums
Latin Grammy Award for Best Rock Album